The 1987 Atlantic Coast Conference men's soccer tournament was the first edition of the ACC Men's Soccer Tournament. The tournament decided the Atlantic Coast Conference champion and guaranteed representative into the 1987 NCAA Division I Men's Soccer Championship.

Bracket

References

ACC Men's Soccer Tournament
1987 Atlantic Coast Conference men's soccer season